Bayernhof Music Museum features a major collection of automated musical instruments from the 19th and 20th centuries.

Bayernhof is the name of the mansion itself, a $4.2 million project completed in 1982 as a private residence by Charles Brown III (1935–1999), founder and CEO of Gas-Lite Manufacturing Company in Pittsburgh. The  house includes a rooftop observatory, an indoor cave, a swimming pool with a  waterfall, ten fireplaces, eight full baths, three powder rooms, three full-size kitchens as well as a completely restored copper still.

The museum was a directive of Mr. Brown's will, and it opened to the public in 2004.

See also
 List of music museums

References

External links
Pro, Johnna A. (2004). Bayernhof Museum Opening: story by Pittsburgh Post-Gazette. Retrieved May 9, 2006.

 Bayernhof Music Museum website
 Automatic Musical Instrument Collectors' Association (AMICA) website
 
 

Museums in Allegheny County, Pennsylvania
Music museums in Pennsylvania
Musical instrument museums in the United States
Historic house museums in Pennsylvania
Houses in Allegheny County, Pennsylvania
Museums established in 2004
2004 establishments in Pennsylvania